Samut Prakan School is a public school in Samut Prakan Province, Thailand. The school is coeducational, teaches junior high school and high school level. Samut Prakan School was a boys school in the past. The school has nine permanent buildings. There are six levels M 1–6. Each class has 12 rooms.

History 
Prince Krom Phraya Damrong Rachanupab established the school as a primary school at Wat Klang, Paknam Muang, Samut Prakan on 18 July 1883. Samut Prakan School began teaching its first year in 1883. In 1917 the Ministry of Justice, the Wat Klang school was renamed Klang High School in 1926 and The Ministry of Education changed the name of the school to Samut Prakan.

Programs 
junior high school 
 Science - Math
 Science 
 English Programs
 normal
high school
 Science - Math
 Science 
 EnglishPrograms
 Arts - Math
 Arts - English
 Arts - French 
 Arts - Japanese 
 Arts - Chinese
 Account
 Agriculture - Industry

References

External links

 Official School Website
 Clubs , parents and teachers in Samutprakanschool 
 School Alumni Association
 Official School Website
 Official School Website2

Schools in Thailand
Buildings and structures in Samut Prakan province
Education in Samutprakan province
Educational institutions established in 1883
1883 establishments in Siam